John Peter Bicourt (25 October 1945 – 16 January 2023) was a British middle-distance runner. He competed in the 3000 metres steeplechase at the 1972 Summer Olympics and the 1976 Summer Olympics. He represented England in the 3,000 metres steeplechase metres event, at the 1974 British Commonwealth Games in Christchurch, New Zealand.

Bicourt died on 16 January 2023, at the age of 77.

References

1945 births
2023 deaths
Athletes (track and field) at the 1972 Summer Olympics
Athletes (track and field) at the 1974 British Commonwealth Games
Athletes (track and field) at the 1976 Summer Olympics
British male middle-distance runners
British male steeplechase runners
Olympic athletes of Great Britain
Commonwealth Games competitors for England
Athletes from London